Keyword AAA is a thesaurus created by the State Records Authority of New South Wales, Australia. It is often used to categorise documents in a document management system. The thesaurus is often implemented in terms of ISO 2788.

External links
 Keyword AAA Overview
 Developing and implementing a keyword thesaurus

Knowledge representation
Library cataloging and classification
Thesauri